WBKB refers to three broadcasting stations.

Current
WBKB-TV, a television station (channel 11) licensed to Alpena, Michigan, United States

Past
WBBM-TV, a television station (channel 2 analog/12 digital) licensed to Chicago, Illinois, United States, which held the call signs WBKB or WBKB-TV from 1946 to 1953
WLS-TV, a television station (channel 7 analog/44 digital) licensed to Chicago, Illinois, United States, which held the call signs WBKB or WBKB-TV from 1953 to 1968